Olya Lilith (born Łaja Cederbaum or  Lolya Tsederboym; 1906 - 1980) was an American singer and actress of the Yiddish Theatre.  

Born in Otvotsk (Otwock) to Neck Cederbaum and Chawa Cederbaum. By 1925, her singing (in Warsaw) attracted the attention of Kvi Pro Kvo (Qui Pro Quo) actor Boronski; it was he who suggested changing her stage name (Federovska) to Ola Lilith. Her husband Władysław Godik convinced her to sing in Yiddish and to join him in founding the famous Warsaw Yiddish nightclub (kleynkunstbine) Azazel in 1925. She sang as a soloist and in duets with Hanush (Ganushem) and Makhevski. She then performed with the Qui Pro Quo troupe – and on her own – throughout Poland and, later, all of Europe, with Vladislav Godik (Willy Godnick) and later with Boris Thomashefsky and Ruth Rene in Czechoslovakia, Austria, France, Berlin, Holland and England. 

She was brought to America by Joseph Rumshinsky and Menashe Skulnick; she performed in New York City in 1931 and played the title role in Rumshinsky's Second Avenue production "A Maiden from Warsaw," with leading man Willy Godick, and subsequently the musical comedy Pleasure. Mordechai Yardeini called her the "Yiddish Edith Piaf." 

Lilith gave concerts in Yiddish, and then in English, in Vaudeville RKO. She returned to Europe in the years just prior to World War II. It has mistakenly been said that she died in a Nazi concentration camp. Instead, after her divorce she emigrated to the United States and became a U.S. citizen in 1935. She refused to join the Yiddish Theater union, calling their audition process "The Inquisition". She sang and performed on WEVD radio programs in New York. Her last acting role was in Ven di zun geyt oyf (Sunrise, When the Sun Rises) with Ludwig Satz and Edmund Zayenda in 1941. She subsequently joined the American army and remarried, to a non-Jewish contractor named Leland Benton; they settled in Miami Springs, Florida, where she died.

References

External links 
  music Henekh Kon, text Moishe Broderzon
  with Willy Godick, music H. Kon, text M. Broderzon

Jewish cabaret performers
Polish cabaret performers
20th-century Polish Jews
1906 births
1980 deaths
20th-century comedians
Polish emigrants to the United States
Yiddish theatre performers